Walter Crook (28 April 1913 – 27 December 1988) was an English football player and manager.

Career

Playing career
Crook, who played as a full back, played in the Football League for Blackburn Rovers and Bolton Wanderers, making a total of 264 appearances. He holds the record for most consecutive Football League appearances by a Blackburn player (208 between 1934 and 1946).

Crook also made one wartime international appearance for England in 1939.

Coaching career
Crook managed Dutch side Ajax between 1948 and 1950, and again between 1953 and 1954. He also managed Sparta Rotterdam and English club sides Accrington Stanley and Wigan Athletic.

Personal life
Walter was born in Whittle-le-Woods, the son of Jane Parker and Alfred Crook. He was married to Doris Sutcliffe.

References

1913 births
1988 deaths
People from Whittle-le-Woods
English footballers
England wartime international footballers
English football managers
Blackburn Rovers F.C. players
Bolton Wanderers F.C. players
English Football League players
AFC Ajax managers
Sparta Rotterdam managers
Accrington Stanley F.C. (1891) managers
Wigan Athletic F.C. managers
English expatriate football managers
Association football fullbacks
English expatriate sportspeople in the Netherlands
Expatriate football managers in the Netherlands